Quercus laurifolia (swamp laurel oak, diamond-leaf oak, water oak, obtusa oak, laurel oak) is a medium-sized semi-evergreen oak in the red oak section Quercus sect. Lobatae. It is native to the southeastern and south-central the United States.

Description 
Acorn production is often heavy, enhancing the species' value for wildlife. The seedlings show embryo dormancy and germinate the following spring after fall ripening; germination is hypogeal.
Swamp laurel oak grows rapidly and usually matures in about 50 years.

A similar evergreen oak that also grows in sandy soils is Quercus hemisphaerica, the sand laurel oak.

Taxonomy 
The botanist C.J. Burke suggested that swamp laurel oak is of hybrid origin having been derived from willow oak (Quercus phellos) and water oak (Quercus nigra); it is not found outside the ranges of the two supposed parental species. This conclusion was based on an index from leaf-shape on seedlings grown from acorns. However, this theory has not achieved wide support, with current authors accepting Quercus laurifolia as a distinct species (e.g. Flora of North America).

Distribution and habitat
Swamp laurel oak grows from coastal Virginia to central Florida and west to southeast Texas. There are reports of the species growing in Pennsylvania and New Jersey, but these probably represent introductions. 

The species is found mostly on alluvial flood plains, from sea level up to  altitude. It will tolerate the wetter sites in association with other oak species but will not live with continuous or prolonged flooding. It is most often found growing in sandy soil near rivers and along the edges of swamps if not too frequently flooded. Swamp laurel oak grows in the hammocks of central Florida and on sand hills adjacent to swamps in west Florida. Swamp laurel oak grows best on ultisols and inceptisols. 

From  of this is received during the growing season from April to September.

The laurel oak is probably one of the most cold-hardy evergreen oaks. In Cincinnati trees have been observed staying green well into December.

Ecology 
Known hybrids with Quercus laurifolia as one parent are with Q. falcata (Q × beaumontiana Sarg.), Q. incana (Q. × atlantica Ashe), and Q. marilandica (Q. × diversiloba Tharp ex A. Camus).

The tree is host to the general oak-feeding insects but has no serious insect problems. Several species of Curculio weevils infest the acorns.

Despite their bitter kernel, the acorns are eaten by deer (including white-tailed deer), squirrels, birds (including ducks, bobwhite quail and wild turkeys), raccoons and small rodents.

Uses 
It is grown and marketed mainly as pulpwood. It is commonly used as an ornamental tree in landscaping because of its fast growth and pleasing appearance; it is planted with little regard to soil type.

References

External links
Trees of Alabama and the Southeast: Swamp Laurel Oak
Florida Forest Trees
Institute of Food and Agricultural Sciences, University of Florida: Laurel Oak or Swamp Laurel Oak?
Knight, H. A. (1982). Personal communication. Forest Resources in the Southeast. Southeastern Forest Experiment Station, Asheville, NC.

laurifolia
Trees of the Southeastern United States
Endemic flora of the United States
Plants described in 1801